Mombo is one of the 20 wards of the Korogwe District, Tanga Region, Tanzania.

The streets of Mombo; Marembwe, Majengo Mapya, Majengo Kati ya Zamani, Machinjioni, Mawenzi, Fune, Mawasiliano, Nyuma ya Bank, Mwisho wa Shamba, Ndulu A, Ndulu B, JBG, Masimbani, Mafuriko, Hospital, Misajini, Jitengeni, Minarani, Makorakanga, Becco, Stesheni, Sandali

Populated places in Tanga Region

References